Nithi Constituency was a former electoral constituency in Kenya. It was the only constituency in the now defunct Meru South District (1992-2009). The constituency was established for the 1988 elections. It is among the few constituencies in Kenya that have embraced technology. More information on the constituency can be viewed on the constituencies official website

Members of Parliament

Locations and wards

References 

Constituencies in Eastern Province (Kenya)
Meru South District
1988 establishments in Kenya
Constituencies established in 1988
Former constituencies of Kenya